Avetik (in Western Armenian Avedik) means "good news" in Armenian

Avetik / Avedik may refer to:

Avedik, official publication of the Armenian Catholic Church

It is a given name for:
Avetik Grigoryan, Armenian chess grandmaster
Avetik Isahakyan, Armenian lyric poet, writer, academian and public activist
Avetik Sahakyan, also known as Father Abraham, Armenian politician, the Parliamentary President (speaker) of the First Republic of Armenia in 1918-19 and government minister 
Arthur Abraham, (born Avetik Abrahamyan), an Armenian-German professional boxer

See also
Avetis (disambiguation)

Armenian masculine given names